Walter Aloysius Kelley (February 18, 1907 - March 1, 2000) was an American Thoroughbred horse racing trainer. Although he began his career as a jockey, he is best known as a trainer who first operated a public stable in 1930 and whose career saw him have second-place finishers in each of the U.S. Triple Crown races.

Racing career
Walter Kelley began his career as a jockey, riding in California where he got his first win in 1922 at Tanforan Racetrack.

Triple Crown results
In 1942 and 1943, Walter Kelley trained Blue Swords for Akron, Ohio radio station owner Allen T. Simmons. Under future U.S. Racing Hall of Fame jockey Johnny Adams, Blue Swords would finish second in both the Kentucky Derby and the Preakness Stakes to eventual U.S. Triple Crown winner Count Fleet. 

Forty-three years later when Walter Kelley was 79 years old he saddled his first Belmont Stakes runner. John's Treasure, owned by Dallas, Texas businessman John R. Murrell, finished second to winner Danzig Connection but ahead of 1986 Kentucky Derby winner Ferdinand. The tragic ending of Ferdinand in a Japanese slaughterhouse would be a catalyst for passionate owner John Murrell to personally provide substantial funding to rescue racehorses from that kind of ending.

Walter Kelley was living in Coral Gables, Florida at the time of his passing at age ninety-three.

References

	

1907 births
2000 deaths
American horse trainers
Sportspeople from Brooklyn